Organization of Iranian People's Fedaii Guerrillas is an Iranian communist group. It was formed in 1985, as a split from the Organization of Iranian People's Fedai Guerrillas (Minority). The organization is currently banned in Iran.

See also

References

External links
iranian-fedaii.de

Communist parties in Iran
Banned communist parties
Banned political parties in Iran
Militant opposition to the Islamic Republic of Iran